Sinikka Marja-Liisa Keskitalo (29 January 1951 – 25 October 2011) was a female long-distance runner from Finland. She competed in the women's marathon for her native country at two consecutive Summer Olympics, starting in 1984. Her best result was the 15th place at the 1984 Summer Olympics in Los Angeles, California. She was born in Jalasjärvi.

Achievements

References
 Sinikka Keskitalo's profile at Sports Reference.com
 Sinikka Keskitalo's obituary 

1951 births
2011 deaths
People from Jalasjärvi
Finnish female long-distance runners
Olympic athletes of Finland
Athletes (track and field) at the 1984 Summer Olympics
Athletes (track and field) at the 1988 Summer Olympics
Sportspeople from South Ostrobothnia